Aleš Hynek (born 4 June 1968) is a retired Czech football defender.

References

1968 births
Living people
Czech footballers
SK Benešov players
FC Hradec Králové players
FK Drnovice players
1. FK Příbram players
Czech First League players
Association football defenders